Rooparam  (also known as Rooparam Dhandev) is an Indian politician from Rajasthan. He is elected Member of 15th Rajasthan Legislative Assembly from Jaisalmer constituency in Rajasthan.  He was ex-Chief Engineer from PHED in Rajasthan. He is an Indian National Congress politician in Rajasthan.

Personal life
Born to Chaukharam, Rooparam hails from Chelak in Jaisalmer district. He did B.E. (Civil) from M.B.M Engineering College in the year 1980. On 30 November 1975, he married Jatna Devi. They have six daughters and a son together.

Political career
In 2013 Rajasthan Legislative Assembly elections, Rooparam contested as an Indian National Congress candidate but was defeated by Bharatiya Janta Party's Chhotu Singh. But he was able to win in the 2019 elections defeating Sansingh Bhati of BJP. He is the MLA from Jaisalmer.

He along with District Collector Namit Mehta, inaugurated the 2019 Desert Festival.

References

Living people
Indian National Congress politicians from Rajasthan
Rajasthan MLAs 2018–2023
1955 births
People from Jaisalmer